Arnaud Clément and Nicolas Mahut were the defending champions, but Mahut did not compete this year. Clement teamed up with Thierry Ascione and lost in the first round to José Acasuso and Sebastián Prieto.

Michaël Llodra and Fabrice Santoro won the title by defeating Acasuso and Prieto 5–2, 3–5, 5–4(7–4) in the final. Shortly after the win, Llodra and Santoro announced that they will no longer play as a pair following the end of the season.

Seeds

Draw

Draw

References

External links
 Main Draw (ATP)
 ITF tournament profile

Open de Moselle - Doubles
2005 Open de Moselle